Pseudomonas vancouverensis is a Gram-negative soil bacterium that grows on pulp mill effluents with resin acids. It was first isolated in Canada.

References

External links
Type strain of Pseudomonas vancouverensis at BacDive -  the Bacterial Diversity Metadatabase

Pseudomonadales
Bacteria described in 1999